Paul Szabo (born 8 October 1954) is a Romanian fencer. He competed in the individual and team épée events at the 1976 Summer Olympics.

References

1954 births
Living people
Romanian male fencers
Romanian épée fencers
Olympic fencers of Romania
Fencers at the 1976 Summer Olympics
Sportspeople from Cluj-Napoca